Culinary names, menu names, or kitchen names are names of foods used in the preparation or selling of food, as opposed to their names in agriculture or in scientific nomenclature. The menu name may even be different from the kitchen name. For example, from the 19th until the mid-20th century, many restaurant menus were written in French and not in the local language.

Examples include veal (calf), calamari (squid), and sweetbreads (pancreas or thymus gland). Culinary names are especially common for fish and seafood, where multiple species are marketed under a single familiar name.

Examples 
Foods may come to have distinct culinary names for a variety of reasons:
 Euphemism: the idea of eating some foods may disgust or offend some eaters regardless of their actual taste
 Testicles: Rocky Mountain oysters, Prairie oysters, lamb fries, or animelles
 Fish milt:  soft roe or white roe to disguise that is actually sperm not eggs
 Thymus gland and pancreas gland: sweetbreads
 Kangaroo meat:  "Australus" has been proposed as a euphemism

 Attractiveness: the traditional name may be considered dull, undistinctive, or unattractive
 Kiwifruit:  a rename of the Chinese gooseberry which has now become its standard name
 Mahi-mahi: the dolphinfish is often referred to with this name to avoid confusion with dolphin (the marine mammal) meat
 The Patagonian toothfish is marketed as the Chilean sea bass
 The African cichlid found in many aquaria is presented as tilapia
 The spinal marrow of veal and beef is called amourettes
 The meat of Asian carps has been marketed in the United States as silverfin or copi to avoid the social stigma and promote it as a commercial food

 Poetic / fancifulness: Many dishes have fanciful or jocular names.
 Drumstick, a chicken's calf
 Angels on horseback, oysters wrapped in bacon
 Pigs in a blanket, various dishes of sausage in dough
 Floating island, egg whites on custard sauce
 Ladyfinger, a type of sponge cake
 Ladyfinger, okra
 İmam bayıldı 'the Imam fainted', eggplant and onion

 Grouping of a variety of sources under a single name
 Tuna, sardine and mackerel are all common names that include a variety of several different (and sometime unrelated) species of food fish

 Evocation of more prestigious, rarer, and more expensive foods for which they are a substitute
 Lumpsucker (or lumpfish) roe is named lumpfish caviar
 Cassia bark is called cinnamon
 Langostino is sometimes called lobster or "langostino lobster"
 In North America, many flounder species are called soles, e.g. Microstomus pacificus is named "Dover sole"

 Evocation of a specific culinary tradition
 Shrimp in Italian-American contexts is often called scampi
 Florentine refers to dishes that include spinach
 Squid is often called by its Italian name, calamari, on menus

 Different terminology stemming from diglossia
 The words beef, veal, pork, mutton, venison and poultry are derived from the words used by the French-speaking lords in post-Conquest England

 Other
 In French, chestnuts are called châtaignes on the tree, but marrons in the kitchen
 Laver is a culinary name for certain edible algae
 Truita de patata (lit. 'potato trout') in Catalan cuisine, a potato omelette: "if you don't catch a trout, you've got to have something more humble for dinner -- something to pretend is a trout".
 Cappon magro (lit. 'fast-day capon'), a seafood salad

Humor and ethnic dysphemism 
Humorous exaltation often takes the form of a dysphemism disparaging particular groups or places. It has been observed that "Celtic dishes seem to receive more than their share of humorous names in English cookbooks". Many of these are now considered offensive. See List of foods named after places for foods named after their actual place of origin. 

 Welsh rabbit, melted cheese on toast. "Welsh" was probably used as a pejorative dysphemism, meaning "anything substandard or vulgar", and suggesting that "only people as poor and stupid as the Welsh would eat cheese and call it rabbit", or that "the closest thing to rabbit the Welsh could afford was melted cheese on toast". Or it may simply allude to the "frugal diet of the upland Welsh". 
 Welsh caviar, laverbread, made of seaweed;
 Essex lion, veal;
 Norfolk capon, kipper;
 Irish apricot, apple, grape, lemon, plum, etc., potato;
 Scotch woodcock, scrambled eggs and anchovies on toast;
 Dutch goose, a stuffed pig's stomach in Pennsylvania Dutch cuisine;
 French goose, a kind of sausage stew;
 English monkey, melted cheese with breadcrumbs soaked in milk, served on toast or crackers;
 Albany beef, Hudson River sturgeon used as a substitute for beef.
 Sea kitten, fish.  A renaming proposed by People for the Ethical Treatment of Animals, in the hope of dissuading people from eating fish, by likening fish to appealing companion animals.

See also

 Trade name
 Brand

Notes

Bibliography

 "Culinary terminology" in Oxford Companion to Food, 1st edition, s.v.
 Andre Simon, A concise encyclopedia of gastronomy mentions 16 different 'culinary names' passim

Names
Food and drink terminology
Culinary arts
Culinary terminology